Formsite is a service that enables non-technical users to build professional quality web forms and surveys with no HTML or coding experience.

History
Formsite is a web-based software service produced by Vroman Systems Inc, a privately held software company based in Chicago, Illinois. Its first production release debuted in February 1999, positioning it as one of the first online form building services to enter the market. Over the course of a decade, Formsite has processed over 500 million form submissions.

Since its release, Formsite has appeared in PC Magazine, been reviewed by About.com, and has been featured in a textbook for entry-level web designers.

Currently, Formsite is ranked in the top 5,000 websites in the world with regards to daily unique visitors.

Services
The Formsite service allows users to design online forms that utilize any HTML form component without any knowledge of the HTML markup language, enabling users without technical skills to efficiently create online forms that look and behave in a professional manner. Formsite forms offer built-in validation and error handling, as well as the ability to process, store, and email form submissions.

Like many software as a service business models, features available to Formsite users are based on an annual subscription fee, which varies depending on the level of service that a user desires, an ad supported, free level of service is offered for light users, along with more expensive options that allow heavier users to create larger forms and store more results.

See also
Html form

References

External links 

Surveys (human research)
Internet properties established in 1998